Bus rapid transit in New Jersey comprises limited-stop bus service, exclusive bus lanes (XBL) and bus bypass shoulders (BBS). Under the banner Next Generation Bus New Jersey Transit (NJT), the New Jersey Department of Transportation (NJDOT), and the metropolitan planning organizations of New Jersey (MPO) which recommend and authorize transportation projects are undertaking the creation of several additional bus rapid transit systems (BRT) in the state. 

In 2011, NJT announced that it would equip its entire bus fleet with devices for real-time locating, thus creating the basis for "next bus" scheduling information at bus shelters. The introduction and expanded use of bus rapid transit in the Garden State is part of the worldwide phenomenon to bring mass transit to heavily trafficked corridors in both high and medium density areas as a cost-saving, and sometimes more flexible, alternative to rail transportation, thus reducing automobile dependency and traffic congestion.

Context

Bus rapid transit
The Federal Transit Administration (FTA) defines bus rapid transit (BRT) is a “rapid mode of transportation that can combine
the quality of rail transit and the flexibility of buses.”
BRT systems can be designed for specific locations and conditions to incorporate any number of features to enhance bus priority traffic circulation and passenger convenience and can operate on exclusive bus lanes or shared roadways and can combine both limited-stops and skip-stops. Characteristics can include bus stops with kiosks for passengers to easily and quickly pre-purchase bus tickets to reduce boarding time, digitalized countdown timetables for real-time bus arrivals and bus information at the bus shelter and via internet websites. Roadways can have signal synchronization, queue jumping, changeable message signs and pavement striping included. Specific BRT branding (wrapping) and specialized vehicles for faster boarding and alighting can be used.

Bus service in New Jersey

New Jersey is the most densely populated state in the United States. In the early part of the 20th century, it was served by an extensive system of interurban and streetcar systems, which were replaced during the era of bustitution in the mid century, partially due to the phenomenon known as the Great American streetcar scandal. New Jersey Transit, created in the 1970s to take over Conrail commuter rail service, assumed control of several floundering bus companies in the 1980s, including the largest, Transport of New Jersey. The government agency has subsequently grown to be third largest provider of commuter rail, light-rail, and bus service in the nation. Additionally, numerous privately operated bus companies also provide regional and local service within the state and to New York and Pennsylvania. The Northeast Corridor runs diagonally across New Jersey between New York City and Philadelphia, cities to which many residents regularly travel. Additionally, commuters of Rockland and Orange counties, west of the Hudson River above the New York state line, and exurban towns in the Lehigh Valley and Pike County, Pennsylvania travel to or through the state.

Real-time bus fleet
Real-time locating is a vehicle tracking or fleet tracking system using Global Positioning System (GPS) technology. NJ Transit (NJT) is expanding real-time service information for bus customers to all routes in the state using what has been dubbed "smart bus" technology that can provide real-time bus location and arrival information to web-enabled devices and to “next bus” signage at key locations. In February 2011, NJT authorized a $22 million contract with Clever Devices LTD to install devices on 1,040 buses serving NJT-operated routes. In November 2011, it authorized another $6 million for Clever Devices to equip NJT contracted bus routes with the devices. Completion of the installation is projected for 2013. More than 1,100 new buses coming on line during the period are pre-equipped, thus making the entire fleet "real-time" capable. Real-time customer use was begun with a pilot involving the Trenton and Princeton areas on routes numbered 600 in December 2012. The "MyBus Now" service allows those with smart phones and computers to access NJT's website to see in-transit buses and expected arrival times for those buses within 30 minutes of a bus stop. Commuters can also text MyBus (69287) with the stop and route number to get the arrival time of the next bus. The service was expanded in 2013 to more than 150 NJT routes for Atlantic City, Camden, Philadelphia, and intrastate routes in North Jersey. It will be expanded to buses traveling to the Port Authority Bus Terminal and the George Washington Bridge Bus Station in early 2014.

Fare payment
NJT sells monthly passes, 10-trip discount tickets and single-fare tickets, which are accepted on most private and contracted buses as well as its own. Cash payment, with many routes being exact-fare lines, is also possible. except for departures from the Port Authority Bus Terminal, where since 2011 tickets or passes are required.

In October 2011, NJT began a pilot project and become the first transportation agency in the USA enabling passengers to use Google Wallet, a contactless payment system, initially available at ticket vending machines at Port Authority Bus Terminal, New York Penn Station, Newark Liberty Airport Station and on certain Hudson County bus routes.

In April 2015 NJT announced that using mobile phone apps to purchase tickets and passes system-wide would be completed.

SmartLink is a smart card used by the Port Authority Trans Hudson, the rapid transit rail system linking Newark, Jersey City, Hoboken, and Manhattan. The Port Authority of New York and New Jersey, which operates the system introduced the card in 2007, as the initial step in creating a universal fare card for the New York metropolitan area. In 2006, estimates for New Jersey Transit to implement use of the card were $100 million.

BRT initiatives
NJ has various policies to promote its smart growth strategy, intended to reduce urban sprawl and preserve open space, to reduce traffic congestion and travel times though decreased automobile dependency, to promote intrastate public transportation use, and to revitalize older urban and suburban areas through transit-oriented development. In 2009, NJDOT adopted a complete streets policy with one of its stated aims to make access to bus stops easier and safer.

The areas targeted for BRT systems are commercial/commuter corridors or high density population or employment centers with a regional transit hub. Some are included in the state's Urban Transit Hub Tax Credit scheme which offers tax relief for developers and employers who relocate or build within walking distance from them. Others have been designated transit villages, meant to promote higher density, pedestrian/public transportation oriented development. In some areas traditional rural and suburban land-use have given way to corporate complexes and shopping malls.

While there are express bus routes and some dedicated bus lanes within the state, the only specifically designed BRT system, the go bus, runs through Newark, the state's largest city, to Newark Liberty International Airport and adjacent communities. Elsewhere exclusive bus lanes (XBL) and bus bypass shoulders (BBS) provide for bus priority traffic patterning. Other proposed BRT and BBS projects are in various stages of study and implementation. While some new systems are geared to improved access to Midtown Manhattan and Center City, Philadelphia most are oriented to developing a comprehensive network of intrastate travel.

Existing systems

Greater Newark

Newark is the largest city in NJ and lies at the heart of the Gateway Region and the Liberty Corridor, the extensive network of road, rail, shipping, and air transportation infrastructure radiating from Newark Liberty International Airport and Port Newark-Elizabeth Marine Terminal. In terms of number of buses in use and passengers served, the Greater Newark bus network is the 20th largest in the United States.

go bus

NJT began service on the first BRT line, go bus 25, in 2008. During peak periods, the line makes limited stops at eleven points between Newark Penn Station and Irvington, running for most of its length along the busy Springfield Avenue transit corridor.

The second BRT line is part of the planned Liberty Corridor Bus Rapid Transit Service network. Funded by the American Recovery and Reinvestment Act, the enhanced bus service was initiated in 2009. The $2 million project includes new bus shelters, signaling priority, and express-limited stop service. The go bus 28 is a full-time service between the airport's North Area Transit Center, its three terminals, the city's central business or campus districts, Branch Brook Park, the Roseville neighborhood, and Bloomfield. Connections to Montclair-Boonton Line and Newark Light Rail (NLR) are possible on the line's northern segment. There are proposals to extend the service westward to Montclair University.

Penn Station-Raymond Boulevard XBL
A XBL in the vicinity of Newark Penn Station, origination point for numerous Greater Newark bus routes, was conceived in 2007 to improve traffic circulation and pedestrian safety and has been in place since 2008. The  dedicated center bus lane is implemented in the PM rush hour to serve westbound buses along Raymond Boulevard between the station and McCarter Highway. The system includes traffic signal synchronization, changeable message signs and pavement striping.

Lincoln Tunnel express bus lane

The Lincoln Tunnel Approach and Helix (Route 495) in Hudson County passes through a cut and descends the Hudson Palisades to the Lincoln Tunnel at the other end of which is the Port Authority Bus Terminal (PABT). Starting in 1964, studies were conducted to address the feasibility of an Exclusive Bus Lane (XBL) during the weekday morning peak period. The XBL was first approved on a trial basis in September 1970, since buses from New Jersey would be stuck in the heavy congestion within the tunnel approaches. This bus lane was implemented in December of the same year, exclusively carrying buses during morning rush hours. Due to the success of the bus lane, it was made permanent after the year-long trial ended.

The XBL serves weekday eastbound bus traffic between 6:00 a.m.–10:00 a.m. It is fed by the New Jersey Turnpike at Exits 16E and 17, and New Jersey Route 3. The helix, tunnel, and terminal are owned and operated by the Port Authority of New York and New Jersey, the bi-state agency that also operates the  contraflow lane along the left lane of three westbound lanes. The XBL serves over 1,800 buses, which transport more than 65,000 persons, each morning and is a major component of the morning "inbound" commutation crossing the Hudson River. Over 100 bus carriers utilize the Exclusive Bus Lane. New Jersey Transit operates fifty-seven interstate bus routes through the Lincoln Tunnel, as do numerous regional and long distance companies.

The PABT is the gateway for most bus and jitney traffic entering Manhattan with around 225,000 passengers on 8,000 bus trips made through the tunnel and terminal on an average weekday. Despite the XBL to the tunnel, there are often long delays due to congestion caused by the limited capacity of bus lanes for deboarding passengers at the bus terminal, which has reached its capacity. This has led to re-routing and overflow on local streets In December 2011, the New Jersey Assembly passed a resolution calling upon the PANYNJ to address the issue of congestion. Thomas Duane, representing New York's 29th Senate District which includes the area around the PABT, has also called for reduced congestion in the neighborhood. A consortium of regional transportation advocates, the Tri-State Transportation Campaign, have proposed a reconfiguration and expansion of the terminal, a PM westbound XBL, bus stops at other Manhattan locations, and a new bus storage depot. Originally part of the PANYNJ 2007-2016 Capital Plan, construction of a bus garage in Midtown Manhattan, so that day-time turnover buses could avoid unnecessarily traveling through the tunnel without passengers, was scrapped by the agency in October 2011. In May 2012, the commissioner of NJDOT suggested that some NJ Transit routes could originate/terminate at other Manhattan locations, notably the East Side, an arrangement requiring approval of the NYC Department of Transportation (NYCDOT) to use bus stops. In June 2013, the PANYNJ commissioned an 18-month Midtown Bus Master Plan study to address enhanced terminal and bus depot facilities. There have also been studies to add a second express bus lane.

Route 9 BBS

Shoulder lanes, or bus bypass shoulders (BBS), along Route 9 are a part of the express bus system in Monmouth-Middlesex. The highway is used by NJT's routes 63, 64, 67 to Hudson County, the 130, 132, 136, 139 to PABT, and Academy Bus to Lower Manhattan.

In 2006, NJDOT reconstructed two stretches of shoulders and made improvements in signals and sidewalks for exclusive bus use during peak hours.

The southern terminus of the extended BBS corridor would be in Lakewood, which along with adjacent Toms River saw major population between 2000 and 2010 and are now respectively the 7th and 8th largest municipalities in the state by population. As of 2011, a $588 million project for expansion of the  segment of Route 9 in the towns was in a "design concept" phase with funding earmarked for 2016-2017 construction. Concurrently, studies are being conducted to explore the possibility of providing rail service to the region. Known as the MOM (Monmouth-Ocean-Middlesex) project various alignments are being considered as to where the line would join either the Northeast Corridor Line or the North Jersey Coast Line.

An extensive analysis by consulting and planning firm Stantec released in 2010 includes recommendations regarding design, construction, and implementation of the BBS extension. The 2nd phase of the project would start at the project's southern end near the Lakewood Bus Terminal near Route 88. The third phase and final phase would connect the northern and southern segments passing through Freehold Township and proximate towns, where work would include some widening and deepening of the roadbed to handle bus traffic.

Compressed natural gas buses were introduced in 2015.

Route 22 BBS
An early use of a BBS (originally called a BOS or bus on shoulder lane) is in Mountainside. Unlike most towns along Route 22, zoning in Mountainside does not allow for much commercial development adjacent to the freeway. For a  stretch in the town, the eastbound shoulder on the arterial road can be used by peak hour buses and allows for queue jumping. In 2009, NJDOT funded construction of two bus turnouts along the road in nearby Union In 2012, NJDOT regulated the BBS as an exclusive bus lane from 6 to 7:30am.

Studies and proposals

Central Jersey Route 1 Corridor

In 2003, NJT funded a BRT feasibility study to be conducted by STV for Route 1 in Mercer County. After assessments conducted in 2006 NJT and the Delaware Valley Regional Planning Commission (DVRPC) determined that a BRT system would be appropriate and have since authorized various studies. The hub of the Route 1 Corridor BRT system would be Princeton Junction in West Windsor. The two trunks of system which would incorporate some of NJT's 600 series intrastate routes and would radiate from the intersection of the Princeton Branch rail line and Route 1 freeway. Princeton Junction is served by NJT's Northeast Corridor Line and as well as peak-hour Amtrak service. Parts of Route 1 are known as the Trenton Freeway and the Brunswick Turnpike in Mercer County, which travels between Trenton and New Brunswick in Middlesex County. While both cities are at the periphery of the system, the core of the Route 1 Corridor BRT would operate within a smaller area and use regional shopping malls as termination/origination points.

Dinky Transitway

The north-south axis of the BRT system would parallel the right-of-way (ROW) of the Princeton Branch, which runs for just under  and is served by a shuttle called the Dinky between Princeton Junction and Princeton Station, located on the Princeton University campus. A greenway providing pedestrian and bicycle paths, as well as exclusive bus lane would be incorporated into the plan. While continued service on the branch is a component of the transitway, relocation of the Princeton Station has been a matter of controversy since at least 2006 when the university announced its intention to construct a new arts center calling for the adaptive re-use of current station house, the shortening of the trackage ROW, and the creation of new terminus  to the south. Rail advocates fear that access to the new station would be less convenient, resulting in decreased ridership that would "threaten the train's existence." The proposal has prompted protest from local residents, as well as students, faculty, and alumni and the creation of the organization Save the Dinky. In October 2010, the Princeton Regional Planning Board passed a resolution supporting the continuation of train service. On October 3, 2011, the Save the Dinky and residents filed suit against the university and NJT to stop the move. Soon after the borough, township, and university entered into a memo of understanding in which the school promises to fund a transit study and provide other benefits in exchange for rezoning for the combine arts/transit project. The station house has been the property of the university since 1984, when it purchased it form NJT, with guarantees of public use. That year it was listed on the state (ID#1742) and national registers of historic places. In 2012, NJT requested abandonment of that public use from the State Historic Preservation Office, Save the Dinky contends that the move would breach the original agreement when the property was transferred, would cause inconvenience, and is poor planning. The university believes it is an improvement and necessary in order to redevelop the neighborhood. In April 2012, the university submitted revised plans for the arts and transit center, which calls for the extension of the station house onto the right of way for possible use as a restaurant. The Regional Planning Board has passed an ordinance requiring the land be preserved for transportation right-of-way that could eventually extend farther into the central business district at Nassau Street. The new station house plans would require the board's approval before construction could start. According to the university, trackage rights would have to change hands in order for the transitway to implemented.

New Brunswick BRT

New Brunswick lies at the heart of Central Jersey and is a key transit hub for the region. The city is served by Amtrak and NJT on the Northeast Corridor, several NJT intrastate bus routes 800 series, the extensive Rutgers Campus bus network, the MCAT shuttle system, DASH buses, Brunsquick shuttles and NYC bound Suburban Trails buses.

The hub of the New Brunswick BRT system would be New Brunswick Station in the city's central business district. It is located near the intersection of Route 18 and Route 27 which would function as the two major corridors for bus network that would connect downtown, residential neighborhoods, the five campuses of Rutgers University in the city and adjacent Piscataway, proximate communities, as well as to the proposed Route One BRT system.

Camden-Philadelphia BRT

A BRT system in the Delaware Valley is part of a broader plan to expand a regional multimodal transportation network in adjacent Camden and Gloucester counties and across the Delaware River to the city of Philadelphia. Other elements of network would include additions and adjustments to PATCO Hi-Speed Line and Atlantic City Line and construction of the Glassboro–Camden Line, an  extension or connection to the light rail River LINE. The region is served by NJT buses 400–499.

The BRT component would be developed along the heavily traveled corridor comprising I-676, Route 42, and Route 55 
The southern end of the system would be a newly constructed park and ride in Deptford on Route 55 and an expanded one in Winslow with peak hour buses running at 10–15 minute intervals. Travelling northwest the two lines would converge to pass through downtown Camden, where transfers would be possible for other components of the network, including at the Walter Rand Transportation Center. They would then continue over the Benjamin Franklin Bridge, equipped with reversible or contra-flow lanes to a point near Philadelphia City Hall. Depending on approval and funding, the BRT system could be completed by 2020. In July 2012, NJT received $2.6 million in federal funding to advance the project.

Bayonne - Journal Square BRT

The opening of the Hudson Bergen Light Rail (HBLR) in 2000 and the increased use of jitneys, locally known as dollar vans, have greatly affected travel patterns in Hudson County, leading to decreased bus ridership on traditional transit corridors. After studies conducted examine existing systems and to address the changes in public transportation it was determined that BRT systems would be appropriate for certain parts of the densely populated urban core of northeastern New Jersey.

Kennedy Boulevard runs the entire length of the peninsula that encompasses much of Hudson, its northern and southern sections meeting at Journal Square, the traditional hub of the county, and site of the Journal Square Transportation Center. The boulevard travels south from the square through the Bergen Section and Greenville in Jersey City to Bergen Point in Bayonne. Service along the corridor had been provided by privately operated Coach USA on two routes: the #10 local service and the #99s (with continuing service to Jersey City Heights and the PABT). Citing reduced ridership and increased competition the company in late 2011/early 2012, announced that it would abandon the routes. After negotiations service was continued in a diminished form and operated by Academy Bus under contract with NJT. The company's #4 route was taken over by A&C Bus Corporation. The routes have since returned to Coach USA in June 2021.

The Bayonne / Greenville / Journal Square Bus Rapid Transit Study, funded by NJTPA and the Hudson County Board of Chosen Freeholders and conducted by Parsons Brinkerhoff, does not propose a dedicated bus ROW for the BRT, but similar to Newark's go bus or New York's Select Bus Service, using city streets. Its ultimate goal is to explore "the feasibility of Bus Rapid Transit (BRT) service along the north-south roadway corridors to improve bus service between Bayonne and Jersey City." It will examine the optimal location of boarding kiosks with scheduling amenities, appropriate vehicles, and branding and explore possible corridors on Broadway, Avenue C, Garfield Avenue, and Ocean Avenue and connections to the Staten Island-bound S89 bus at the HBLR 34th Street Station. As of March 2013, preliminary studies identified Kennedy Boulevard as the best potential corridor perhaps in hybrid route with Bergen Avenue and MLK Drive.

In anticipation of a general increase of activity at Port Jersey and new development on West Side and Hackensack Riverront in Jersey City studies are being conducted to transform routes 440 and 1/9 into a multi-use urban boulevard that includes possible grade separations, meridians, and traffic circle, thus creating a viable BRT corridor.
As envisioned, the BRT corridor would run from Droyer's Point and reach Journal Square via Sip Avenue.

Union go bus expressway

The proposed Union County go bus system is part of the planned Liberty Corridor Bus Rapid Transit Service network centered around Newark Liberty International Airport. The hub of the Union network would be the unused former Central Railroad of New Jersey (CNJ) station in Elizabeth which is adjacent to the NJT's Elizabeth Broad Street Station that is served by the Northeast Corridor Line and the North Jersey Coast Line. Proposals call for reconstruction and better integration of the two stations as Midtown Station. The district has been identified as one of the state's major potential transit-oriented development (TOD) centers.

The northern end of the system would travel through Midtown and the parking areas, the terminals, and freight shipping facilities and the North Transit Area at Newark Liberty, (partially following Union County Light Rail route plan that was scrapped in 2006). A spur on this portion would travel to Jersey Gardens, a regional shopping mall.

In a southwesterly direction the system would utilize an abandoned portion of the CNJ's mainline, now the Raritan Valley Line (RVL), right-of-way between Midtown Station and the Aldene Connection. A parallel greenway providing pedestrian and bicycle paths, would be incorporated into the plan. Once joining the RVL the busway would allow for transfers at Cranford Station and Garwood Station, where it would end. The go bus expressway would generally parallel New Jersey Route 28

Bergen BRT

While served in part by rail, adjacent Bergen and Passaic counties nonetheless rely heavily on bus mass transit for public transportation. The Passaic-Bergen Rail Line is a now dormant project that would have created a cross-county (east-west) system using DMUs. The Northern Branch Corridor Project, advanced to environmental impact statement stage, is a planned extension of the Hudson Bergen Light Rail serving the eastern part of region closest to the Hudson Palisades. Various studies have been conducted and proposals have been made to create a comprehensive bus network, including the development of BRT routes concentrated in the vicinity of NJ Route 17, a frequently congested commercial and commuter corridor between the Meadowlands Sports Complex and the New York State line, running on a southeast-northwest diagonal between NJT's Main-Bergen and Pascack Valley rail lines. Of particular focus is the Hackensack/Paramus area, where there is a concentration of "activity generators" -shopping malls, colleges, hospitals, and government offices - both north and south of Route 4, an important east-west corridor. The intersection of Routes 4 and 17 is one of the busiest in the world. Largely "built-out", Bergen and Passaic are seeing a trend toward transit oriented development conducive to BRT.

Route 17 Bergen Rapid Transit Study (2006)

In the 2006 final report Route 17 Bergen Rapid Transit Study STV Incorporated proposed two BRT lines would have originated/terminated at Secaucus Junction, a major NJT rail interchange station between New York Penn Station and Newark Penn Station. At the time Access to the Region's Core (ARC), an extensive rail infrastructure project which included new Hudson River tunnel was in its planning stages with the presumption it would be built. ARC was canceled in 2010. The Blue Route would have travelled from the northern part of the county and then run express from Hackensack along Interstate 80 and the New Jersey Turnpike. The Orange Route would have travelled from Paramus through the southern part of the county.

Northeast NJ Metro Mobility Study (2009–2012)
Initiated in 2009 with the participation NJTPA, NJT, and Coach USA, a wide-ranging Northeast New Jersey Metro Mobility Study is examining improvements to bus service in bi-county region and proximate areas in Essex, Hudson, Orange, Rockland and Manhattan. Particular attention is given to the plaza, bridge and bus station named for George Washington. Potential improvements include new and restructured bus and shuttle routes; vanpool, carpool, or other non-traditional transit programs and subsidies; BBS lanes, queue jumping, and transit signal priority to expedite buses through congested intersections; new or enhanced park and ride facilities and transit hubs; improved passenger facilities and access at bus stops; and informational enhancements and better coordination of various transit services. In 2012, NJDOT allocated nearly $1million in funding.

Bergen Rapid Transit Study (2010)
In 2010, Parsons Brinkerhoff's Vision Bergen: Blueprint For Our Future Networking Transportation To Make It Work Route 17 identified a number of trunk and branch BRT routes for the county, and recommended the Blue Route as the best alternative for a pilot project. It is estimated that implementing the route would cost $45 million.

Bus Rapid Transit Implementation Study (2012)
In October 2011, NJT said that there is no funding available for implementation of a BRT system, but that a study would establish an "action plan" should any become available. In November 2011 the Bergen County Board of Chosen Freeholders and NJT agreed jointly fund $600,000 for the Bus Rapid Transit Implementation Study, the purpose of which is to identify two or more BRT routes and enhancements between bus and rail service. The study addresses changing travel patterns, particularly the fact that nearly 60% of commuter trips are made within the county.

In June 2014, it was announced that five "preferred" routes had been established. Two originate/terminate at the Port Authority Bus Terminal, with one travelling along the Hudson Waterfront and local streets to Garden State Plaza and the other along Route 17 to the Montvale Park & Ride. Two originate/terminate a Secaucus Junction, one to Bergen Community College via Route 17 and one to Englewood Hospital via local streets and the New Jersey Turnpike. The fifth route would travel between Broadway Bus Terminal and George Washington Bridge Bus Station along Route 4 Parson Brinkerhoff intends to bring out it recommendations from the study in January 2015. In November 2014, it was announced that three potential routes would be studied: In September 2017, a new study was released which identified four (A,B,C,D) preferred BRT routes.

Meadowlands
The New Meadowlands plan was developed in response to the effects of Hurricane Sandy in towns in the New Jersey Meadowlands.
The proposed Meadowlands would be a series of berms constructed along the perimeter of the Meadowlands District in Bergen and Hudson. The raised areas would provide flood mitigation in the Hackensack River floodplain and would provide new corridors for the development of BRT systems in the region. The first phase, funded with $150 million by the U.S. Department of Housing and Urban Development (HUD), will begin with construction of berms in Little Ferry, Moonachie, Carlstadt, and Teterboro in 2014-2015.

Evaluation of Next Generation BRT Services in the NJTPA Region (2014)
In 2014 the North Jersey Transportation Planning Authority completed a study for guidance for the implementation of BRT and BRT-like services along previously-identified potential BRT corridors in North Jersey. The analysis considers various types of systems and conditions such as: urban, suburban, grade separated, and rural/hybrid rights of ways.

References

External links 

NJT Facts at Glance
Federal Highway Administration
NYU analysis

 
NJ Transit Bus Operations
Bus transportation in New Jersey
Surface transportation in Greater New York